On 17 February 2020, a suicide bombing occurred in Quetta, Balochistan, Pakistan. The attacker was on a motorcycle and detonated his bomb as police tried to stop him entering a Sunni extremist religious rally near a press club. At least 10 people - including two police officers - were killed and another 35 people were injured.

No one has claimed responsibility for the attack. Quetta is frequently attacked by Sunni Islamists as well as by Baloch separatist insurgents.

References

2020 in Balochistan, Pakistan
2020 murders in Pakistan
2020 road incidents
February 2020 bombing

21st-century mass murder in Pakistan
February 2020 crimes in Asia
February 2020 events in Pakistan
Mass murder in 2020
February 2020 bombing
Motorcycle bombings
Road incidents in Pakistan
Suicide bombings in 2020
February 2020
Terrorist incidents in Pakistan in 2020